ORF 2 (ORF zwei, formerly FS2) is an Austrian public television channel owned by ORF. It was launched on 11 September 1961 as a technical test programme. Today it is one of the four public TV channels in Austria.

ORF 2 is available via DVB-T in Germany near the Austrian border and in parts of Munich. It is funded by a mixture of advertising breaks and a television licence fee; as such, unlike its German equivalents (which are generally available free-to-air), ORF 2 and its sister stations are encrypted over satellite.

History 
ORF 2 started broadcasting three days a week as a "Technical Test Program" (Technisches Versuchsprogramm) on 11 September 1961. In 1967, the Versuchsprogramm was renamed as FS2 (Fernsehen 2; 'Television 2'), and its broadcasting days were increased to five days a week, which remained the case until 1 September 1970 when it began broadcasting daily. On 2 May 1988, regional news programmes known as Bundesland heute (The States Today) were introduced for each Austrian state. On 26 October 1992, FS2 was renamed as ORF 2.

On 9 January 2012, a complete design change took place, similar to that of ORF eins a year prior. In line with the clear design of ORF eins, a vertical navigation bar was introduced as a central on-air element to join together programme credits, idents, promotions and commercial breaks. The red and white design is designed to underline the strong Austrian identity of the station.

Programming 
In contrast to ORF 1, which focuses on TV series, movies and sports, ORF 2 broadcasts more Austrian-oriented and cultural programs. The most important news broadcast Zeit im Bild is broadcast several times a day, with the flagship bulletin being broadcast at 7:30pm each night. Bundesland heute (news for the federal states) is broadcast directly before this at 7:00pm; nine regional window programs are broadcast - one for each state. In the broadcasting area of Tyrol and in South Tyrol, which is part of Italy, Südtirol heute is broadcast from Monday to Friday at 6:30 pm, which is produced by the ORF studio in Bolzano (until March, 2021 by the ORF Landesstudio Tirol in Innsbruck).

Entertainment 
Eurovision Choir (2017)
Eurovision Young Musicians

Information 
Zeit im Bild

Series 
Gomorrah (Gomorrha - Die Serie) (2015–2016)
Prime Suspect (Heißer Verdacht) (2009, 2011)
Tatort (2006–present)

Reception 
All nine regional feeds of ORF 2 can be received via satellite: these are all encrypted and can only be watched by viewers who have an ORF viewing card, which is available to anyone who pays the ORF licence fee. An international version of ORF 2, known as ORF 2 Europe, has been broadcast unencrypted over satellite in Europe since July 2004; certain programmes for which ORF does not have the rights to broadcast outside Austria are replaced with a video feed of ORF 2's teletext service, accompanied by the audio of Ö1. Many of ORF 2's programmes, such as some Zeit im Bild bulletins, are also broadcast or repeated on 3sat.

Since October 2006, ORF 2 has been broadcast terrestrially via DVB-T in Austria. Via multiplex A, the regional feed of the viewer's own state can be received, as well as that of a neighboring federal state.

Logos and identities

References

External links 
 ORF 2 TV listings

Television stations in Austria
Television channels and stations established in 1961
1961 establishments in Austria
ORF (broadcaster)